Bandar Lengeh Airport  is an airport in Bandar Lengeh, Iran.

Airlines and destinations

References

Airports in Iran
Transportation in Hormozgan Province
Buildings and structures in Hormozgan Province